National Front coalition may refer to:

 National Front (East Germany), a former alliance in East Germany
 National Front Coalition (Egypt), an Egyptian political coalition